The UK Singles Chart is one of many music charts compiled by the Official Charts Company that calculates the best-selling singles of the week in the United Kingdom. Before 2004, the chart was only based on the sales of physical singles. This list shows singles that peaked in the Top 10 of the UK Singles Chart during 1990, as well as singles which peaked in 1989 and 1991 but were in the top 10 in 1990. The entry date is when the single appeared in the top 10 for the first time (week ending, as published by the Official Charts Company, which is six days after the chart is announced).

One-hundred and forty-two singles were in the top ten in 1990. Eight singles from 1989 remained in the top 10 for several weeks at the beginning of the year, while "Pray by MC Hammer, "Sadeness (Part I)" by Enigma and "The Grease Megamix" by John Travolta and Olivia Newton-John" were all released in 1990 but did not reach their peak until 1991. Thirty artists scored multiple entries in the top 10 in 1990. Adamski, Happy Mondays, MC Hammer, Mariah Carey and Snap! were among the many artists who achieved their first UK charting top 10 single in 1990.

The 1989 Christmas number-one, "Do They Know It's Christmas?" by Band Aid II, remained at number-one for the first week of 1990. The first new number-one single of the year was "Hangin' Tough" by New Kids on the Block. Overall, eighteen different singles peaked at number-one in 1990, with Cliff Richard and Kylie Minogue (2, including the Band Aid II charity single) having the joint most singles hit that position.

Background

Multiple entries
One-hundred and forty-two singles charted in the top 10 in 1990, with one-hundred and thirty-one singles reaching their peak this year.

Thirty artists scored multiple entries in the top 10 in 1990. American boyband New Kids on the Block secured the record for most top ten singles in 1990 with eight hit singles. "Hangin' Tough" reached number-one, where it remained for two weeks, and a further three weeks in the top ten. Other entries included "Step by Step" (number 2), "Tonight" (3) and "Cover Girl" (4). Former Neighbours actress Kylie Minogue had three top ten singles in 1990. "Tears on My Pillow" spent one week at number-one in January; "Better the Devil You Know" (2) and "Step Back in Time" (4) also reached the top ten. Madonna continued her success from the 1980s with four more top ten hits in 1990. "Vogue" was the highest entry, peaking at number-one for 1 week in April; "Dear Jessie", "Hanky Panky" and "Justify My Love" were the other singles to reach the top 10.

Rapper and DJ MC Hammer had three top-ten entries, including his biggest hit and signature song, "U Can't Touch This", which peaked at number 3 in August. Cliff Richard, Jimmy Somerville and Jive Bunny and the Mastermixers were the other artists to reach the top 10 with three singles in 1990.

Beats International were one of a number of artists with two top-ten entries, including the number-one single "Dub Be Good to Me". Adamski, Black Box, Happy Mondays, Michael Bolton and The Stone Roses were among the other artists who had multiple top 10 entries in 1990.

Chart debuts
Seventy artists achieved their first top 10 single in 1990, either as a lead or featured artist. Of these, eight went on to record another hit single that year: Adamski, Beats International, The Farm, Happy Mondays, Mantronix, Michael Bolton, Paul "Gazza" Gascoigne and Ya Kid K. MC Hammer had two more top 10 singles in 1990. Snap! had three other entries in their breakthrough year.

The following table (collapsed on desktop site) does not include acts who had previously charted as part of a group and secured their first top 10 solo single.

Notes
Jimmy Somerville had a successful career as a member of Communards and Bronski Beat prior to 1990, and had also participated on the Band Aid II charity single. His cover of "You Make Me Feel (Mighty Real)" became his first solo top 10 single. David A. Stewart had his first top 10 credit in 1990 without music partner Annie Lennox and the band Eurythmics, whose songs included "Sweet Dreams (Are Made of This)". "Lily Was Here" reached number 6 in March.

Englandneworder was a collaboration between New Order and members of the England squad selected for the 1990 FIFA World Cup, including John Barnes contributing the main rap and Paul "Gazza" Gascoigne on vocals. The KLF first appeared in the chart under the pseudonym The Timelords, but their first official single under their new name came this year.

Along with her late sister Mel, Kim Appleby had entered the top 10 on several occasions as the duo Mel and Kim, including 1987's number-one single "Respectable". "Don't Worry" was her first hit on her own.

Songs from films
Original songs from various films entered the top 10 throughout the year. These included "Tears On My Pillow" (from The Delinquents), "It Must Have Been Love" (Pretty Woman), "Turtle Power!" (Teenage Mutant Ninja Turtles), "Show Me Heaven" (Days Of Thunder) and "Unchained Melody" (Ghost).

Additionally, "Hanky Panky" was used to promote the film Dick Tracy and appeared on the soundtrack album although the song itself did not appear in the actual film.

Best-selling singles
The Righteous Brothers had the best-selling single of the year with a reissue of their 1965 hit "Unchained Melody". The single spent nine weeks in the top 10 (including four weeks at number one), sold over 840,000 copies  and was certified platinum by the BPI. "Nothing Compares 2 U" by Sinéad O'Connor came in second place, selling more than 600,000 copies and losing out by around 240,000 sales. Elton John's "Sacrifice"/"Healing Hands", "Ice Ice Baby" from Vanilla Ice and "Killer" by Adamski made up the top five. Singles by Maria McKee, Beats International featuring Lindy Layton, Madonna, Englandneworder and Snap! were also in the top ten best-selling singles of the year.

Top-ten singles
Key

Entries by artist

The following table shows artists who achieved two or more top 10 entries in 1990, including songs that reached their peak in 1989 or 1991. The figures include both main artists and featured artists, while appearances on ensemble charity records are also counted for each artist.

Notes

 "Pray" reached its peak of number eight on 12 January 1991 (week ending).
 "Sadeness (Part I)" reached its peak of number-one on 19 January 1991 (week ending).
 "You Got It (The Right Stuff)" re-entered the top 10 at number 10 on 6 January 1990 (week ending).
 Released as a charity single by Band Aid in 1989 to aid the continuing efforts towards famine relief in Ethiopia.
 "The Brits 1990" was created by Mike Gray but the Official Charts credits it to Various Artists.
 "World in Motion" was released as the official single (with the permission of the Football Association) to celebrate England's 1990 FIFA World Cup campaign.
 Englandneworder was made up of the group New Order and members of the England squad for the 1990 FIFA World Cup.
 "Nessun dorma" was used by the BBC in their coverage of the FIFA World Cup in 1990.
 "Unchained Melody" originally peaked at number 14 upon its initial release in 1965. It was re-released after being used in the 1990 film Ghost, topping the chart and becoming the best-selling single of the year.
 "Take My Breath Away" originally peaked at number-one upon its initial release in 1986 after the release of Top Gun. It was re-released in 1990 when the film premiered on British television and the song was also used in a commercial for the Peugeot 405.
 England footballer Paul Gascoigne was credited by his nickname Gazza for the song "Fog on the Tyne (Revisited)".
 "Falling" was the theme song to the ABC television series Twin Peaks.
 "Kinky Boots" was first released in 1964 but failed to chart.
 "You've Lost That Lovin' Feelin'" originally peaked at number-one upon its initial release in 1965. It previously re-entered the top 10 at number 10 in 1969, number 42 in 1977 and number 87 in 1988. "Ebb Tide" originally peaked at number 48 on its initial release in 1966. In 1990, the two songs were re-issued together as a double A-sided single.
 Figure includes single that peaked in 1989.
 Figure includes an appearance on the "Do They Know It's Christmas?" charity single by Band Aid II.
 Figure includes single that peaked in 1991.
 Figure includes vocals on Englandneworder's "World in Motion".
 Figure includes appearance on Technotronic's "Get Up! (Before the Night is Over)".
 Figure includes appearance on Technotronic's "Rockin' Over the Beat".

See also
1990 in British music
List of number-one singles from the 1990s (UK)

References
General

Specific

External links
1990 singles chart archive at the Official Charts Company (click on relevant week)
Official Top 40 best-selling songs of 1990 at the Official Charts Company

United Kingdom
Top 10 singles
1990